Caamaño is a Spanish-language surname. It may refer to:

Álvaro Eugenio de Mendoza Caamaño y Sotomayor (1671–1761), Spanish aristocrat and priest
Darlene Caamaño (born 1970), American film producer
Ernesto Noboa y Caamaño (1889–1927), Ecuadorian poet
Francisco Caamaño (1932–1973), Dominican politician and colonel
Francisco Caamaño Domínguez (born 1963), Spanish politician
Francisco Caamaño Rojas (born 1989), Chilean politician
Gustavo Caamaño (born 1979), Argentine footballer
Jacinto Caamaño (1759–1825), Spanish explorer
Jacinto Jijón y Caamaño (born 1890), Ecuadorian historian and politician
José Antonio de Mendoza Caamaño y Sotomayor (1667–1746), Spanish colonial administrator
José Plácido Caamaño (1837–1901), Ecuadorian politician, 12th President of Ecuador
Ramón Acha Caamaño (1861–1930), Spanish general
Vladimir Caamaño (born 1979), American comedian and actor

Locations:
Alberto Mena Caamaño Museum, a museum in Quito, Ecuador
Caamaño Passage, strait in British Columbia, Canada
Caamaño Sound, sound in British Columbia
Francisco Alberto Caamaño metro station, metro station in Santo Domingo, Dominican Republic

See also
Camano (disambiguation)
Carcamano

Spanish-language surnames